Herniss is a hamlet in the civil parish of Mabe in west Cornwall, England. Herniss is on the A394 main road. It is in the civil parish of Stithians

References

Hamlets in Cornwall